Andrew Hampsten (born April 7, 1962) is an American former professional road bicycle racer who won the 1988 Giro d'Italia and the Alpe d'Huez stage of the 1992 Tour de France. Between 1986–1994 he finished in the Top 10 of eight Grand Tours.

Racing career
Andy Hampsten caught the public eye in 1985, when he won stage 20 of the Giro d'Italia.  The following year, he was signed by Bernard Hinault's La Vie Claire team.  In his first full season as a pro, 1986, he won the Tour de Suisse and helped his compatriot and team leader Greg LeMond to victory in the Tour de France. He also finished the Tour de France fourth overall and claimed the white jersey of best young rider.

Hampsten repeated his victory in the 1987 Tour de Suisse, this time for the 7-Eleven Cycling Team. He defeated multi-time Tour de France stage winner Peter Winnen by +0:01 and Fabio Parra by +0:07. His greatest moment came in the 1988 Giro d'Italia, on a short stage over the Gavia Pass. Attacking on the climb Hampsten overcame a severe snowstorm to take the Maglia Rosa, becoming the first American to do so; although he finished second on the stage to Dutchman Erik Breukink, who was considered a main favorite to win the Giro. The conditions during this stage were among the worst in cycling history. During and following this stage numerous cyclists abandoned and several had to be loaded into ambulances and taken to the hospital due to hypothermia like symptoms. After surviving this Gavia Pass stage, Hampsten was able to successfully defend his lead through the rest of the race, becoming the just the 2nd American to win a cycling Grand Tour and the 1st American to win the Giro d'Italia.

During the 1989 Giro d'Italia Hampsten performed at an elite level among the General Classification riders finishing on the podium in 3rd place overall. He was also among the elite riders for the majority of the 1990 Tour de France.

Hampsten's final highlight came in the 1992 Tour de France when he dropped his breakaway companions to win the stage to Alpe d'Huez.  He again finished the race fourth, having lost his third place to Gianni Bugno in the final time trial.

Life after racing
Hampsten used to live in Grand Forks, North Dakota, and the  bikeway system there has been dedicated as the "Andy Hampsten Bikeway System." Hampsten now lives in Tuscany and Boulder, Colorado. In 1999, Andy Hampsten and his brother Steve started a bicycle company in Seattle, Washington, called Hampsten Cycles.  Andy Hampsten also operates a bicycle touring company in Italy called Cinghiale Cycling Tours.

Career achievements

Major results
Source:

1984
 2nd Overall Coors Classic
 9th Overall Grand Prix Guillaume Tell
1985
 1st Stage 20 Giro d'Italia
 2nd Overall Coors Classic
1986
 1st  Overall Tour de Suisse
1st Prologue
 4th Overall Tour de France
1st  Young rider classification
 4th Overall Coors Classic
1987
 1st  Overall Tour de Suisse
 3rd Overall Coors Classic
1st Stages 9 & 12a (ITT)
 8th Trofeo Pantalica
1988
 1st  Overall Giro d'Italia
1st  Mountains classification
1st  Combination classification
1st Stages 12 & 18 (ITT)
 1st Stage 3 Paris–Nice
 2nd Overall Coors Classic
1st Stage 10a
 4th Overall Tour de Romandie
 9th Overall Critérium International
1989
 1st Subida a Urkiola
 1st Stage 2 Tour of the Basque Country
 3rd Overall Giro d'Italia
 6th Milano–Torino
 7th Tre Valli Varesine
 8th Clásica de San Sebastián
 10th Overall Tour de Trump
1990
 1st Subida a Urkiola
 3rd Overall Tour de Suisse
1st Stage 7
 8th Overall Critérium du Dauphiné Libéré
 9th Overall Tour de Trump
1991
 3rd Overall Tour de Suisse
1st  Mountains classification
 5th Overall Paris–Nice
 7th Overall Critérium du Dauphiné Libéré
 8th Overall Tour de France
 9th Overall Volta a Catalunya
 10th Overall Giro del Trentino
1992
 1st  Overall Tour de Romandie
1st Stage 3
 4th Overall Tour de France
1st Stage 14 (Alpe d'Huez)
 5th Overall Giro d'Italia
 5th Coppa Agostoni
 6th Giro dell'Emilia
 7th Overall Tour Méditerranéen
 7th Tre Valli Varesine
 10th Coppa Bernocchi
1993
 1st  Overall Tour of Galicia
1st Stage 2
 2nd Paris–Camembert
 3rd Overall Tour de Romandie
 3rd Subida a Urkiola
 7th Overall Paris–Nice
 8th Overall Tour de France
1994
 3rd Overall Tour de Romandie
 3rd Overall Setmana Catalana de Ciclisme
 10th Overall Giro d'Italia
1996
 6th Overall Tour DuPont

Grand Tour general classification results timeline

References

External links
Hampsten Cycles
Bike touring company Hampsten runs
Story and interview with Hampsten about his 1988 Giro win.

1962 births
Living people
American male cyclists
American Giro d'Italia stage winners
American Tour de France stage winners
Sportspeople from Grand Forks, North Dakota

Giro d'Italia winners
Sportspeople from Columbus, Ohio
Tour de Suisse stage winners
Cyclists from Ohio
Sportspeople from Boulder, Colorado
20th-century American people
21st-century American people